Prodromos Meravidis (born in 1910 and died 10 August 1981) was a pioneer of Greek cinema.

Biography
He shot the first Greek movie with sound and established the first color film development lab.  In 1933, Meravidis filmed Volos and Pelion, while in 1936 he presented the first talkie newsreels in the Cineak theatre.

In the early 1940s, along with other photographers and filmmakers, he shot several newsreels and other short films in the front lines in Albania. From 1945 until 1950, he filmed in all of Greece using 16 cm film on behalf of the Greek War Relief Fund, which financed the reconstruction of the countryside.  His short film Kos (1949–50) was the first Greek color movie.

Selected filmography

As cinematographer

As producer

As director

As editor

References

External links

Year of birth unknown
1981 deaths
Film people from Athens
Greek screenwriters
Greek film directors
Greek film producers
1910 births
20th-century screenwriters